The Lespar Library of Women's Liberation is a Western Australian feminist library.

The library was opened in 1979 in a building owned by Karin Hoffmann at Darlington, Western Australia.

There are some 3000 titles in its collection. It is housed within the Gay and Lesbian Archives of Western Australia (GALAWA), located in the Geoffrey Bolton Library at Murdoch University.

Holdings include international as well as Australian feminist magazines, including the Union of Australian Women's Our Women (1953–1971), Everything: Anarchist Feminist Magazine (1979–1985), As If (1973) and Lip, A Feminist Arts Journal (1976–1984).

The library's catalogue has not been digitised, but three editions have been published in book form, the most recent in 1986.

See also 

 Jessie Street National Women's Library
 The Women's Library

References 

1979 establishments in Australia
Feminism in Australia
Archives in Australia
Libraries in Perth, Western Australia
Libraries established in 1979